Black: Implication Flooding is a collaborative album between Japanese experimental artist Keiji Haino and Japanese experimental band Boris, released on Inoxia Records in 1998. The album was recorded live at Koenji 20000V on August 31, 1997, and features edited cuts from that concert.

Track listing

Personnel
 Takeshi Ohtani - Bass, Vocals
 Atsuo Mizuno - Drums, Vocals
 Wata - Guitar, Vocals

External links
 A flyer of the show
 Unofficial Keiji Haino Homepage (English)
 Haino's Official page (Japanese)

Boris (band) live albums
1998 live albums
Inoxia Records live albums